Aeroflot Flight 3739 may refer to two aviation accidents:
Aeroflot Flight 3739 (1976), 24 deaths
Aeroflot Flight 3739 (1988), 9 deaths

Flight number disambiguation pages